Succinea philippinica is a species of air-breathing land snail, a terrestrial gastropod mollusk in the family Succineidae, the amber snails.

Distribution
This species is endemic to Palau.

References

 Discover Life info

Fauna of Palau
Succineidae
Gastropods described in 1893
Taxonomy articles created by Polbot